Time for Tyner is the ninth album by jazz pianist McCoy Tyner and his third released on the Blue Note label. It was recorded in May 1968 and features performances by Tyner with vibraphonist Bobby Hutcherson, bassist Herbie Lewis and drummer Freddie Waits.

Reception

The Penguin Guide to Jazz selected this album as part of its suggested "Core Collection" calling it "a powerhouse performance from first to last." The Allmusic review by Scott Yanow calls the album "A fine all-round showcase for McCoy Tyner in the late '60s".

Track listing
All compositions by McCoy Tyner except as noted.
 "African Village" - 12:11
 "Little Madimba" - 8:34
 "May Street" - 5:22
 "I Didn't Know What Time It Was" (Hart, Rodgers) - 7:10
 "The Surrey with the Fringe on Top" (Hammerstein, Rodgers) - 5:12
 "I've Grown Accustomed to Her Face" (Lerner, Loewe) - 4:27

Personnel
McCoy Tyner - piano
Bobby Hutcherson - vibes (tracks 1-4)
Herbie Lewis - bass (tracks 1-5)
Freddie Waits - drums (tracks 1-5)

References

1969 albums
Blue Note Records albums
Post-bop albums
McCoy Tyner albums
Albums produced by Duke Pearson
Albums recorded at Van Gelder Studio